The Dome at America's Center is a multi-purpose stadium used for concerts, major conventions, and sporting events in downtown St. Louis, Missouri, United States. Previously known as the Trans World Dome from 1995 to 2001 and the Edward Jones Dome from 2002 to 2016, it was constructed largely to lure a National Football League (NFL) team back to St. Louis and to serve as a convention space.

The Dome received its initial main tenant with the arrival of the NFL's St. Louis Rams, who relocated to the city in 1995. The Rams spent the next twenty-one seasons at the Dome, departing after the 2015 NFL season to return to Los Angeles. The St. Louis BattleHawks of the revived XFL began playing at the stadium in early 2020.
 
The Dome provides multiple stadium configurations that can seat up to 82,624 people. Seating levels include a private luxury suite level with 120 suites, a private club seat and luxury suite level with 6,400 club seats, a concourse level (lower bowl) with 28,352 seats, and a terrace level (upper bowl) with 29,400.

The Dome is part of the America's Center convention center. The convention portion has a much bigger footprint and adjoins to the west of the Dome, Cole Street to the north, Broadway to the east, and Convention Plaza to the south. The stadium is serviced by the Convention Center MetroLink rail station.

Architecture
The stadium's exterior facade is clad in brick, limestone, and precast concrete tinted to resemble red sandstone. The intended effect was for the venue to less resemble a stadium, and more resemble the look of public libraries and city school buildings built in the era preceding World War II.

History
In 1988, the St. Louis Cardinals left St. Louis for Phoenix, Arizona, leaving St. Louis without a National Football League team. Looking to re-enter the league, St. Louis proposed building a domed stadium for a team to play in and attaching the Dome to the convention center to expand convention center capacity. The funding for the project was accomplished via public bonds beginning in 1989. In 1991, St. Louis put in for an NFL expansion franchise for 1995 called the St. Louis Stallions and began construction on The Dome in 1992. However, in 1993, the league chose Charlotte, North Carolina, and Jacksonville, Florida, over St. Louis.

After St. Louis came up short in its expansion bid, it appeared that the city might land a new team anyway. Advertising executive James Orthwein, a St. Louis native and member of the Busch family, bought the New England Patriots in 1992 from Victor Kiam to resolve a debt between the two men. The Patriots had long been in financial malaise since original owner Billy Sullivan, who was still the team president during Kiam's ownership, had squandered all of his net worth on a series of bad investments in the mid-1980s and was forced to sell the team to Kiam and Foxboro Stadium to Robert Kraft. Immediately upon purchase, Orthwein made it clear that he wanted to relocate the team from Foxborough, Massachusetts to St. Louis and was to leave New England at the end of the 1993 season. Orthwein's plans to move the team however were thwarted when Kraft refused to let Orthwein out of the long-term lease that he had secured from Kiam and Sullivan as part of his purchase of the stadium. Orthwein did not want to own the team if he could not move it, and Kraft initiated a hostile takeover that resulted in his purchase of the Patriots in 1994.

The then under-construction Dome finally received the NFL tenant it was looking for in 1995 when Georgia Frontiere announced she would relocate her Los Angeles Rams to St. Louis for the 1995 season. This move was initially voted down, with 21 opposed, three in favor (the Rams, Cincinnati Bengals and Tampa Bay Buccaneers), and six abstaining. The other owners (led by Buffalo's Ralph Wilson, the Jets' Leon Hess, the Giants' Wellington Mara, Washington's Jack Kent Cooke, Arizona's Bill Bidwill and Minnesota's John Skoglund) believed that the Rams' financial problems were caused by Frontiere's mismanagement. When Frontiere threatened to sue the league, commissioner Paul Tagliabue acquiesced to Frontiere's demands. As part of the relocation deal, the city of St. Louis guaranteed that the stadium's amenities would be maintained in the top 25% of all NFL stadiums. After playing their first four home games of the 1995 season at Busch Memorial Stadium because the Dome was not ready, the Rams' first game in the stadium on Sunday, November 12, 1995, was a 28–17 win over the Carolina Panthers.

Renovations

The Dome received a $30 million renovation in 2009, which replaced the scoreboards with LED video displays (one large in north end zone and one smaller in south end zone) and LED fascia boards around the bowl of the Dome. The renovations also added new premium areas (Bud Light Zone and Clarkson Jewelers Club). Some of the paint work in the Dome was lightened as well and painted in Rams colors (Blue, Gold, and White). In 2010, the Rams locker room was re-built and switched ends from the north end zone to the south end zone. For 2011, new HD monitors were installed throughout the Dome in place of the older screens at concession stands and other areas.
Before the 2010 season, the Dome also received a new permanent turf surface. The surface, manufactured by AstroTurf, is AstroTurf's Magic Carpet II Conversion System, which features its GameDay 3D Synthetic Turf System. This system is similar to the original turf system that was in the Dome from 1995 to 2004 whereas it can be rolled up and stored underground in a pit at the Dome. The Dome used a FieldTurf brand surface from 2005 to 2009.

The loss of the Rams (2012–2016)
The Dome's primary problem throughout the years centered on a lease signed by the Rams when they came to St. Louis in 1995. For the first decade, the Dome was considered a fine facility, but eventually the Rams and city leaders became concerned with the Dome's long-term viability.

The lease and poor rankings
Under the terms of the lease that the Rams signed in 1995, the Dome was required to be ranked in the top quartile of NFL stadiums through 2015, measured at 10 year intervals. This meant the Dome had to have the proper fan amenities and other features found in modern NFL stadiums. If the building was not ranked in the top quartile, the Rams were free to break the lease and either relocate without penalty or continue to lease the Dome on a year-to-year basis.

Not helping matters was the Dome's poor reception with NFL fans and the general public as the years went by. Even after the 2010 renovations many websites ranking the 31 NFL stadiums listed the Dome near the bottom of their respective rankings. In 2008, for a Sports Illustrated poll, St. Louis fans ranked it the worst out of any NFL stadium at the time with particularly low marks for tailgating, affordability and atmosphere. Time magazine in May 2012 ranked the Dome as the 7th worst major sports stadium in the United States. The Dome's exterior was regarded as an "urban eyesore from the get-go, an ugly multi-purpose dome that's one defining feature was its inability to fit into any conceivable cityscape...[that] takes up several city blocks but never developed any reasonable interesting business around it: It has always looked like a huge mall from that sad time in recent American history when cities bragged about how big of a mall they could build". Inside, the Dome was "too vast and too cavernous to hold a lot of sound...[and] was the sort of building that felt empty even when it was full", even during the "Greatest Show on Turf" halcyon days of the Rams.

In 2005, the rankings indicated that the Dome was no longer in the top quartile as mandated by the lease, which gave the Rams the right to begin the process of breaking the lease, or reverting to a year-to-year. The Rams, wishing to afford St. Louis ample opportunity to meet the quartile requirement, instead agreed to waive this right for the 2005 checkpoint in return for $30 million of renovations and improvements. However, both the Rams and city leaders realized at this time that long-term, the Dome needed a major overhaul or St. Louis would again risk losing the Rams after 2015.

Negotiations
With the 2015 deadline looming, the Convention and Visitor Center (the stadium's operator) and the Rams negotiated throughout 2012 on the renovations and agreed to go into arbitration in 2013 if a deal was not worked out in which three arbitrators mutually agreed on from the American Arbitration Association to arbitrate the case in 2013.

In January 2012, the CVC proposed $48 million in improvements including a new 947-vehicle garage, all funded publicly, with the Rams keeping the garage game-day revenue.
After the Rams rejected the $48 million deal, the CVC next proposed $124 million in renovations including a new three-story structure on Baer Plaza on the east side facing the Mississippi River for a main entrance as well as new suites. This proposal had the Rams picking up $64 million of that project, the CVC citing an approximate percentage of what other NFL teams had chipped in for on similar renovations.
The Rams countered with a $700 million proposal that called for much of the stadium to be rebuilt including a sliding roof panel and a new four-sided center scoreboard, the Rams asserting that this would satisfy the "first tier" top quartile requirement relative to the current NFL stadium landscape. No details on how to pay for the renovations were made. The sides did not hammer out an agreement in 2012 and the matter went into arbitration hearings in January 2013. Officials noted that even if the arbitrators decided on implementing a more expensive plan and the CVC was unable to fund it the Rams would still be able to break the lease.

With no agreement between both sides in 2013 there was considerable speculation on the future of both the Rams and the stadium with some suggesting the Rams could return to Los Angeles. Further pressure for St. Louis to resolve the issue was that bonds for construction of the Dome were still being paid and would continue to be paid through 2021. Missouri was paying $12 million/year and the City and County of St. Louis were each paying $6 million/year.

On February 1, 2013, the arbitrators ruled in favor of the Rams' $700 million proposal to tear down half the Dome and replace it as the only way among the options presented to bring the Dome up to first-tier status. Various city and county officials said it was unlikely that public funding would be found for such a project. Officials noted that the Rams were contractually obligated to play in the Dome until March 15, 2015, and there was no "buy out" provision to permit the Rams to move before then. City and county officials said they were considering all options including construction of a new stadium elsewhere in the St. Louis area. Rams officials, meanwhile, indicated their preference to stay in St. Louis.

The St. Louis Regional Convention (the stadium's owner) and Sports Complex Authority hired Goldman Sachs in February 2013 "to keep the Rams in the Dome, or, if that's not possible, to maintain a National Football League team in St. Louis."  An attorney for St. Louis noted that Goldman had "financed or advised on the financing of every NFL stadium recently built." In April 2013, it was reported by the Wall Street Journal that the arrangement was being scrutinized by the Securities and Exchange Commission as new Dodd–Frank rules restricted firms from offering financial advice to municipalities where it also underwrites its municipal bond transactions. Eventually the hiring fell through and nothing resulted from it.

On July 2, 2013, the CVC announced that they were rejecting the Rams' renovation proposal. Missouri governor Jay Nixon had been negotiating with owner Stan Kroenke since the decision had been made. The earliest the Rams could have broken the lease on the Dome was following the 2014 season, but they chose not to do so in 2014.

Inglewood purchase
On January 31, 2014, both the Los Angeles Times and the St. Louis Post-Dispatch reported that Stan Kroenke purchased approximately 60 acres of land adjacent to the Forum in Inglewood, California. Commissioner Roger Goodell represented that Mr. Kroenke informed the league of the purchase. Kroenke subsequently announced plans to build an NFL stadium on the site, in connection with the owners of the adjacent  Hollywood Park site, Stockbridge Capital Group. This development further fueled rumors that the Rams intended to return its management and football operations to Southern California. The land was initially targeted for a Walmart Supercenter but Walmart could not get the necessary permits to build it. On January 5, 2015, The Los Angeles Times reported that Stan Kroenke and Stockbridge Capital Group were partnering up in developing a new NFL stadium on the Inglewood property owned by Kroenke. The stadium would likely be ready by 2019.

In lieu of this St. Louis countered with a stadium plan on the north riverfront area of downtown, known as National Car Rental Field, with the hope of persuading Kroenke to keep the Rams in the city. However, on February 24, 2015, the Inglewood City Council approved the stadium and the initiative with construction planned to begin in December 2015.

This generated further debate between the NFL, St. Louis, and the Rams as to whether the Rams should be allowed to relocate when a "first tier" stadium plan was in process. The NFL and the Rams countered that the stadium plan was developed outside of the agreed-upon lease and "first tier" remediation and arbitration process, and therefore could not be considered a binding factor in preventing the Rams from relocating. In addition, the NFL and the Rams expressed concerns over the funding and maintenance of the proposed stadium, which they felt shifted too much of the costs of construction and maintenance to the Rams organization. Ultimately, as the Inglewood stadium would be built without taxpayer subsidy, that effectively sealed the fate of the Rams in St. Louis.

The Rams leave St. Louis
The last Rams game at The Dome was on Thursday, December 17, 2015, which they won, 31–23 over the Tampa Bay Buccaneers. The Rams formally filed their request to leave St. Louis for Los Angeles on January 4, 2016. On January 12, the NFL approved the Rams' request for relocation to Los Angeles for the 2016 NFL season.
Once the team left, Missouri taxpayers shouldered the remaining $144 million in debt and maintenance costs on the stadium until the debt was paid off in 2021. In the immediate time period after the Rams left the Dome was mainly used for concerts and events overflow from America's Center, including the September 18, 2018 St. Louis stop for Taylor Swift's Reputation Stadium Tour. The Dome still suffers from several design flaws that make it less and less desirable as a convention center. More recently, the Regional Sports Authority has called for additional upgrades to the Dome, to remain competitive for attracting events. Upgrades in lighting, sound, video boards, and various amenities could cost as much as $300 million. Upgrades like this would continue to bring big concerts and conventions to St. Louis, and potentially allow the city to bid for large sporting events like the NCAA Men's Basketball Final Four and College Football Bowl Games. The renewal of the Illinois–Missouri football rivalry in 2026 could also potentially be held at the Dome. Similar upgrades were made to the Alamodome in San Antonio, which after $50 million in upgrades hosted the 2018 Final Four.

Football returns with the BattleHawks

On November 27, 2018, sources confirmed plans by the new XFL to place one of their 8 teams in St. Louis, whose five home games would be played in the Dome during the league's inaugural season in 2020. This marked the first time professional football had been played in St. Louis since the loss of the Rams. Officials at the Dome also confirmed they had previously been in talks with the former Alliance of American Football, but had to turn down hosting a team due to scheduling conflicts in spring of 2019 (the AAF ended up shutting down before its season was completed). A busy season for the Dome, including hosting a Boat Show, a Monster Jam event, a Garth Brooks concert, and an AMA Supercross Championship event, meant that the Dome did not have five open weekends to host football games. This left an opening for the XFL to fill, which began play in spring 2020.

On December 5, 2018, at a press conference at MetLife Stadium, Oliver Luck, the then-CEO and Commissioner of the XFL, announced that St. Louis had been awarded a team. The Dome is one of two XFL venues with a roof. Along with the Alamodome, Camping World Stadium, Cashman Field and Lumen Field, it is one of five XFL venues in a downtown city center.

On December 10, 2018, news outlets released the agreement between the league and the St. Louis Convention and Visitors Commission. The XFL pay a $300,000 deposit and $100,000 for every game played in the Dome. The XFL receives 100% of ticket revenue, and the CVC receives 100% of concessions and catering revenue. This contract was signed for three seasons.

The first XFL game at the Dome was held on Sunday, February 23, 2020, when the BattleHawks defeated the New York Guardians by a score of 29–9. Opening Day attendance was the highest in the XFL at 29,554.

At the time, XFL games did not use any seats at the Terrace Level of the Dome, bringing the capacity for games down to about 30,000. Given the high ticket sales, the team considered using the Terrace Level, but with the season truncated by the COVID-19 pandemic, those plans didn't came to fruition in 2020

For the team's home opener the 2023 season, an estimated 35,000 tickets sold for the team's March 11 home opener and both the terrace level and the upper decks of the dome were opened to accommodate the high demand. The game drew an XFL record 38,310 attendance, eclipsing the previous record St. Louis set in 2020 and record of 38,253 set by the San Francisco Demons of the original XFL in 2001.

Naming rights
During its planning and construction, the Dome was known as The Dome at America's Center. Trans World Airlines, a St. Louis-based air carrier, purchased naming rights in 1995 and held them until 2001, when TWA was acquired by American Airlines (American already had its name on two NBA/NHL venues in Dallas and Miami). During this time, the Dome was known as the Trans World Dome.

The facility then briefly reverted to the Dome at America's Center until the naming rights were acquired on January 25, 2002, by Edward Jones Investments, a financial services firm based in St. Louis.

As part of a deal to sell the naming rights to Rams Park (dubbed at the time the Russell Athletic Training Center), the Rams' training facility in Earth City, Missouri, to sportswear manufacturer Russell Athletic, the Rams agreed to rename the Edward Jones Dome to Russell Athletic Field for the Rams' Monday Night Football game against the Chicago Bears on December 11, 2006. The renaming was for the one night only.

After the St. Louis Rams relocated to Los Angeles in 2016, Edward Jones exercised its right to terminate its sponsorship, and the facility was once again known as The Dome at America's Center.

Notable events

NFL playoff football
The Dome hosted five NFL playoff games, including the 1999 and 2001 NFC Championship Games, both of which the Rams won. The city's previous NFL franchise, the St. Louis Cardinals, never hosted a playoff game in their history with the city (1960–1987); all of the playoff games they played were on the road.

Concerts

Professional soccer

The Dome hosted a soccer friendly match on October 13, 2007, when the United States women's national soccer team (USWNT) played Mexico women's national football team. The United States won 5–1. Attendance for the match was 10,861.

The Dome hosted a soccer match on August 10, 2013, when Real Madrid and Internazionale played a friendly game in front of 54,184 fans, a record attendance for a soccer match in St. Louis.

College basketball

In April 2005, the Edward Jones Dome hosted the 2005 NCAA Division I men's basketball tournament Final Four. Louisville, Illinois, Michigan State and North Carolina met, with North Carolina winning the title game against Illinois.

The Dome has hosted an NCAA Men's Basketball Regional four times. In 2004, the St. Louis Regional saw Georgia Tech defeat Kansas in a final that required overtime. Tech had previously defeated Nevada while KU became the first team (and the only one to date) to score 100 points in a college basketball game in the building in its regional semifinal win over UAB. The Dome also hosted the 2007 Midwest Regional, where Florida, en route to winning its second consecutive national championship, defeated Butler and then Oregon, who had defeated UNLV in the other regional semifinal. In 2010, Michigan State eliminated Northern Iowa, and Tennessee knocked off Ohio State, before MSU beat UT to move on to the Final Four. In 2012, North Carolina beat Ohio University and Kansas defeated NC State University. In the regional final, KU defeated UNC to advance to the Final Four.

College football
The Edward Jones Dome hosted the first Big 12 Conference football championship game in 1996 (Nebraska versus Texas). The third game, in 1998, was also held in the Dome (Kansas State versus Texas A&M). The Dome has also been a neutral site for regular-season college football match ups between the University of Illinois and the University of Missouri, promoted locally as the "Arch Rivalry". Missouri has won all six games (2002, 2003, 2007, 2008, 2009 and 2010). On October 3, 2022, the University of Missouri announced a return of Mizzou Football to St. Louis. Mizzou will play the University of Memphis Tigers on September 23, 2023. The Tigers last played in St. Louis in 2010, a 23–13 win over Illinois, the final game of the Arch Rivalry Series, which ran from 2002 to 2010. Mizzou went 6–0 in that series. The game is part of a new partnership with the St. Louis Sports Commission which will host multiple Mizzou athletic events in the St. Louis area during the 2023-24 season – the Mizzou To The Lou Series.

MSHSAA Show-Me Bowl
The Dome held the annual Missouri State High School Activities Association football championship games from 1996 to 2015. The Show-Me Bowl had previously been contested at Faurot Field in Columbia, Arrowhead Stadium in Kansas City, Robert W. Plaster Stadium in Springfield and Busch Memorial Stadium. MSHSAA had chosen to move to the Dome mostly because it was an indoor facility, as the football championships occurred in December. With the Rams' departure and anticipated end of football at the facility, the MSHSAA voted to return to rotating hosts, with Springfield getting the 2016 championship and Columbia in 2017. As of 2022 all games are played at Faurot Field in Columbia, Missouri.

Legends of the Dome game
On Saturday, July 23, 2016, the Isaac Bruce Foundation hosted a charity flag football game to raise money for the Isaac Bruce Foundation and relive great memories from the Rams' time in St. Louis. Many members of the Greatest Show on Turf including Kurt Warner, Dick Vermeil, Mike Martz, Torry Holt, Ricky Proehl, Az Hakim, Marc Bulger, Orlando Pace, Aeneas Williams, and many others were among the players and coaches involved. At halftime, 2016 Pro Football Hall of Fame and longtime Rams All-Pro left tackle Orlando Pace was honored. Retired Navy Petty Officer Generald Wilson performed the National Anthem. The former "Voice of the Rams" Steve Savard called the game live on 101 ESPN radio in St. Louis. 10,600 fans were on hand for the game.

Religious conferences
Currently, the building hosts the annual Joyce Meyer Ministries Love Life Women's Conference, attended by 10,000 to 20,000 women each year. The building also hosts the Church of God in Christ's annual Holy Convocation. Other major religious conventions/conferences include:

It became the site of the biggest indoor gathering in United States history, on January 27, 1999, when Pope John Paul II held mass in the stadium. Over 104,000 people attended.
In 1999 the Rev. Billy Graham held the Greater St. Louis Billy Graham Crusade, with well over 200,000 people attending throughout the four days. Michael W. Smith and Kirk Franklin were among the musical artists who performed. 
In 2005, the Dome hosted the General Conference Session of Seventh-day Adventists.
In 2007, the Nazarene Youth Conference was held at the stadium. 
From 2009 to 2019, the Dome hosted the International Holy Convocation of the Church of God in Christ.
The InterVarsity Christian Fellowship Urbana missions conference, held every three years, has been held at the Dome since 2006. It returned from December 27 to 31, 2018.
The Dome also hosted the 85th annual General Conference of The United Pentecostal Church International on September 30 – October 4, 2009.
The Dome hosted the North American Youth Congress, a biennial gathering of young people via the Youth Ministries Division of the United Pentecostal Church International from July 31 to August 2, 2019.
The Dome hosted one of the many 2019 International Convention of Jehovah's Witnesses, having 30,000 in attendance, with the theme of "Love Never Fails" from August 16 to 18, 2019.
 The dome hosted the Fellowship of Catholic University students (FOCUS) annual SEEK conference from January 2nd-6th, 2023. The conference had 17,000 in attendance.

Castrol Gateway Dirt Nationals
The Dome hosted the first ever Gateway Dirt Nationals on December 15–17, 2016, featuring late model and modified events on a  dirt track, the largest indoor oval track in the United States. Nearly 100 Open Late Models and 130 Open Modifieds entered in the three day event. The race surface, built in four days, was a 1/5th mile banked oval. Late model driver Scott Bloomquist won the main event and $20,000 in front of nearly 15,000 spectators, but not to be outdone by the pass from Shannon Babb on Bloomquist during the Friday night main event with Jason Feger and Darrell Langian running close behind with only two laps remaining. Open Modified driver Tommie Seets Jr. won the main event and $10,000. 
The 2nd Gateway Dirt Nationals took place on December 14–16, 2017, and again featured late model and modifieds. Thursday night, Shannon Babb took the win in the first annual late models "Race of Champions". Friday night, Tanner Mullens won the modified main event, locking himself into Saturday night's main event. In the late models, 17 year-old Hudson O'Neal won the first of two main events. The second late model feature on Friday night saw Gordy Gundaker win. On Saturday night Bobby Pierce picked up the $30,000 check in the late model main event. In the modifieds Ray Bollinger picked up the $10,000 to win A-Main. It was announced that the 3rd Annual Gateway Dirt Nationals would take place November 29, and 30, and December 1, 2018.

Other events

From 2011 through 2017, the Dome hosted the World Championship of the FIRST Robotics Competition. 600 teams from around the world qualify annually to compete in the championship held in mid-April. The FIRST LEGO League World Festival and FIRST Tech Challenge Championship occur at the same time, in nearby venues. 
The Dome hosted the Nerium International's Spring Conference in April 2014; and the 35th and 37th Annual Herbalife Extravaganza in July 2015 and 2017 respectively.
The Music for All Bands of America St. Louis Super-Regional championships has been held annually at the Dome since 1997.
The Dome hosted an AMA Supercross Championship round since 1996.
In 1998, the Dome was home to the largest pro wrestling crowd in Missouri state history  when WCW broadcast a live Monday Nitro event on TNT. Nearly 30,000 attended live, braving an ice storm to attend. This record would stand until 2022. WCW would return on May 9, 1999, with a pay-per-view event titled "Slamboree", which drew 20,516 fans.
The Dome hosts Monster Jam events every year.
In 2013, the Dome hosted a round of the Stadium Super Truck series.
The Dome hosted Drum Corps International's inaugural 'DCI Midwestern Championship' on July 15, 2018.
Season 12 of the NBC series American Ninja Warrior was filmed at The Dome, eschewing a traveling format due to the COVID-19 pandemic in the United States.
The Dome hosted the WWE pay-per-view (PPV) event Royal Rumble on January 29, 2022. This was the first WWE event to be held in the building, and WWE announced a record attendance of 44,390 fans.

St. Louis Football Ring of Fame

Former Cardinals and Rams football players were included in the St. Louis Ring of Fame in the Dome. During the Rams' time in St. Louis the names were displayed on an overhang surrounding the field.  Bold indicates those elected to the Pro Football Hall of Fame.

References

External links

Official site

 

Defunct National Football League venues
St. Louis Rams stadiums
St. Louis BattleHawks
Covered stadiums in the United States
American football venues in Missouri
Sports venues in St. Louis
Multi-purpose stadiums in the United States
Big 12 Championship Game venues
Event venues established in 1995
Sports venues completed in 1995
Tourist attractions in St. Louis
1995 establishments in Missouri
NCAA Division I men's basketball tournament Final Four venues
Sports venues in Missouri
XFL (2020) venues